Dan Stone is a British DJ from Norfolk, United Kingdom.  He specializes in electronic dance music, specifically trance.  He has been signed to Anjunabeats, an EDM label, and his music has appeared frequently on music programs such as Armin Van Buuren's A State of Trance.

Career

At the age of 17, Stone started DJing as a resident performing various genres of music such as house, trance and garage. He began producing music in 2005 and signed with Anjunabeats in 2006. In 2017, he launched the FSOE Fables record label, which specializes in melodic and euphoric trance.

References

External links 
 

British DJs
British trance musicians
Living people
Year of birth missing (living people)
Place of birth missing (living people)
Electronic dance music DJs